La Gomera is a Spanish Denominación de Origen Protegida (DOP) for wines that covers the entire island of La Gomera (Canary Islands, Spain) comprising the six municipalities of San Sebastián de la Gomera, Hermigua, Agulo, Vallehermoso, Valle Gran Rey and Alajeró. It obtained its official status in 2009.

Climate and Geography
La Gomera is a very mountainous island and cultivation of vines is difficult and laborious. The vines are planted in terraces on steep slopes with walls built of stone. Traditionally the vines were left to grow along the ground, but vines have been trained along trellises (en espaldera).

Vineyards and Wineries
There are currently (as of 2015) around 125 ha planted to vines and registered with the Regulatory Council of the DOP and around 150 grapegrowers and 7 wineries registered.

Authorised Grape Varieties
The authorised grape varieties are:
 Red: Castellana Negra, Listán Negro, Malvasía Rosada, Negramoll, Listán Prieto, Tintilla, Bastardo Negro, Cabernet Sauvignon, Pinot Noir, Ruby Cabernet, Syrah, Tempranillo, Vijariego Negro,  Merlot, Moscatel Negro

 White: Albillo, Bermejuela, Forastera Blanca, Gual, Doradilla, Malvasía Volcánica, Malvasía Aromática, Moscatel de Alejandría, Sabro, Verdello, Vijariego, Breval, Listán Blanco, Pedro Ximénez, Bastardo Blanco, Torrontés

The Regulatory Council also controls other criteria such as:
 Maximum authorized planning density: 4,000 vines/ha
 Maximum authorized must yield: 70%

References

External links
 D.O.P. La Gomera official website

Wine regions of Spain
Spanish wine
Appellations
Wine classification
Canary Islands cuisine